Kincora is a census-designated place in Loudoun County, Virginia, United States. The CDP was first drawn prior to the 2020 census.

Geography
Kincora is in eastern Loudoun County, between Virginia State Route 28 to the east and Broad Run to the west. It extends north to Virginia State Route 7 and south to Gloucester Parkway. Russell Branch Parkway runs north–south through the center of the CDP. Kincora is bordered to the east by Dulles Town Center and to the north, west, and south by Ashburn.

Via north-flowing Broad Run, the community is part of the Potomac River watershed.

References
 

Census-designated places in Loudoun County, Virginia
Washington metropolitan area
Census-designated places in Virginia